The 2021 Maui Invitational Tournament was an early-season college basketball tournament played for the 38th time. The tournament began in 1984 and will be part of the 2021–22 NCAA Division I men's basketball season. The Championship Round was planned to be played at the Lahaina Civic Center in Maui, Hawaii from November 22 to 25, 2021. Because of COVID-19 concerns, most notably ongoing restrictions on travel to Hawaii, the tournament was moved to the Michelob Ultra Arena on the Las Vegas Strip in Paradise, Nevada. The start date remains unchanged, but the title game was moved to November 24.

Bracket

References

Maui Invitational Tournament
Maui Invitational
Maui Invitational Tournament
Maui Invitational Tournament